Muhammad Hakimi bin Abdullah (born 9 November 1999) is a Malaysian professional footballer who plays as a winger for Malaysia Super League club Terengganu and the Malaysia national team.

Club career

Kelantan
Hakimi made his senior debut on 10 October 2018 in Malaysia Cup.

International career
On 23 September 2021, Hakimi received his first call-up to the Malaysia national team, for central training and friendly matches against Jordan and Uzbekistan.

Career statistics

Club

International

References

External links
 

1999 births
Living people
Malaysian footballers
People from Kelantan
Kelantan FA players
Terengganu FC players
Malaysia Super League players
Malaysian people of Malay descent
Association football forwards
Association football midfielders